Federal Service for Defence Contracts of the Russian Federation (short name Rosoboronzakaz) was the governmental office that obeyed the Russian Ministry of Defence.

It controlled and supervised Russian central and regional executive authorities and officials when they acted in the area of contracting services for the needs of the Ministry.

It was formed on March 11, 2003. On September 8, 2014, president Vladimir Putin and prime minister Dmitry Medvedev agreed to dissolve it. Rosoboronzakaz's functions were transferred to the Federal Antimonopoly Service; licensing for other defense contract services was transferred to the Ministry of Industry and Trade.

See also
 Armed Forces of the Russian Federation
 Defense industry of Russia
 Military-Industrial Commission of Russia

References

External links
 https://web.archive.org/web/20080223113749/http://www.fsoz.gov.ru/ — Rosoboronzakaz official website

Government of Russia
Government agencies established in 2003
Government agencies disestablished in 2014
2003 establishments in Russia
2014 disestablishments in Russia
Defunct government agencies of Russia